Asghar Nadali (born September 19, 1985) is an Iranian footballer who currently plays for Sanat Sari in the Azadegan League.

Club career
Nadali joined Esteghlal in 2007 after spending the previous season at Nassaji and re-joined Nassaji following that campaign. nadali then joined Gostaresh Foolad, followed by Esteghlal Ahvaz with Sanat Sari being the side where he currently plays.

Club career statistics

 Assist Goals

References

1985 births
Living people
Nassaji Mazandaran players
Esteghlal F.C. players
Gostaresh Foulad F.C. players
Esteghlal Ahvaz players
Sanat Sari players
Iranian footballers
Association football forwards
People from Qaem Shahr
Sportspeople from Mazandaran province
21st-century Iranian people